The Kneeling Christian is a popular and influential book written by Albert Ernest Richardson who authored the book under the pseudonym "Unknown Christian".

Authorship

The author mentions visiting Pandita Ramabai's work while being in India which indicates that the book was written sometime between the 1920s and the early 1930s. The Preface to the book in Hendrickson Christian Classics Edition mentions that according to the records of the British Library,
the "Unknown Christian" was an Anglican clergyman named Albert Ernest Richardson, who was born around 1868. He was educated at the University of Oxford, ordained as a priest in 1897, and in 1898 he was accepted as a missionary and left for the Hausaland Mission in Africa... He returned to England in 1900, only to turn around in 1903 and go out again, this time to serve in Bombay, India, until 1905. Following his return from India, Richardson's passion for evangelism was channeled into his career with the Church Army, a society of evangelists with the Anglican Communion. Then he began publishing his writings in 1921. The Kneeling Christian was his second book.

The Unknown Christian in this book mentions his experiences in India:
A few years ago, when in India, I had the great joy of seeing something of Pandita Ramabai’s work. She had a boarding-school of 1,500 Hindu girls. One day some of these girls came with their Bibles and asked a lady missionary what St. Luke xii. 49 meant—“I came to cast fire upon the earth; and what will I, if it is already kindled?” The missionary tried to put them off with an evasive answer, not being very sure herself what those words meant. But they were not satisfied, so they determined to pray for this fire. And as they prayed—and because they prayed—the very fire of heaven came into their souls. A very Pentecost from above was granted them. No wonder they continued to pray!

Reception
The book has been reprinted many times and has been included in many study guides and derivative works including:

 
 
 
 
 

In addition, a number of works have been based on or derived from The Kneeling Christian, some of which are as follows:

 
 
 
 
 
 Biblical software packages such as Accordance

Quotations from the book 

It is not too much to say that all real growth in the spiritual life—all victory over temptation, all confidence and peace in the presence of difficulties and dangers, all repose of spirit in times of great disappointment or loss, all habitual communion with God—depend upon the practice of secret prayer.
We may be assured of this—the secret of all failure is our failure in secret prayer.
All Revivals have been the outcome of prayer.
Prayer is the touchstone of true godliness.
Answers to prayer, however, do not depend upon our feelings, but upon the trustworthiness of the Promiser.

References

External links 
 The Kneeling Christian at CCEL Library
 The Kneeling Christian at Internet Archive

Christian prayer
Christian devotional literature